Crystal Theatre is a historic theater in Gonzales, Texas. It has hosted vaudeville performances, silent movies, and talkies, and later became a coffee house and dinner theater venue. It was reopened in 2009 with a focus on youth programs.

History
The theater opened in 1913 or 1917. With 586 seats, it was used for vaudeville, also under the name New Playhouse, and as a movie theater, then for dinner theater. It was restored in 1982 by Crystal Theatre, Inc. but was used only occasionally for a number of years before reopening in 2009 with a reduced seating capacity of 125 and a focus on youth programs. An acting program for high school students has taken place since the early 1990s and now includes "Shakespeare ninjas". Barbara Crozier is the theatre's president.

References

External links
 Official website

Buildings and structures in Gonzales County, Texas
Theatres in Texas
Children's theatre